Gustave Danneels (Loos-en-Gohelle, France, 6 September 1913 – Knokke, 13 April 1976) was a Belgian professional road bicycle racer. He is known for bronze medals in the 1934 and the 1935 UCI Road World Championships and his victories in Paris–Tours. When winning the 1936 edition of Paris-Tours Danneels was awarded the Ruban Jaune for recording the fastest time in a professional race.

Major results

1931
  U17 Road Race Champion
1933
  Independent Road Race Champion
1934
 Paris–Tours
 GP d'Europe
  World Road Race Championship
1935
  Road Race Champion
 Winner Stage 2, Tour of Belgium
  World Road Race Championship
1936
 Paris–Tours
 Winner stages 3 and 6 Paris–Nice
1937
 Paris–Tours
Tour de France:
Winner stage 11B
1938
 Winner stages 4 & 5, Tour du Sud-Ouest

Notes

External links 

Official Tour de France results for Gustave Danneels

1913 births
1976 deaths
Belgian male cyclists
Belgian Tour de France stage winners
Sportspeople from Pas-de-Calais
Cyclists from Hauts-de-France